Dudan (also Romanized as Dūdān and Dowdān) is a village in Makvan Rural District, Bayangan District, Paveh County, Kermanshah Province, Iran. At the 2006 census, its population was 564, in 137 families.

References 

Populated places in Paveh County